Behind Enemy Lines: Colombia is a 2009 American action war film directed by Tim Matheson and starring Joe Manganiello, WWE wrestler Mr. Kennedy, Keith David and Matheson. It is the third installment in the series, following Behind Enemy Lines, and Behind Enemy Lines II: Axis of Evil. The film was co-produced by WWE Studios, written by Tobias Iaconis and released direct-to-video on January 6, 2009.

Plot
Colombia is in chaos, as a five-man team of U.S. Navy SEALs embark on a secret mission to ensure that peace talks between the country's government and insurgent guerrillas do not erupt into violence. An unforeseen complication threatens all-out war. Out of nowhere, the meeting falls under attack and the leaders from both sides are killed. The SEALs have been framed for the crime, leaving them to fight for their lives from behind enemy lines against the Colombian Special Forces (AFEUR). Abandoned by their government and left for dead, the weary warriors race to uncover the evidence that will prove their innocence while ensuring that the violence is contained. Should the fighting spill over the border, the entire region or both sides could be plunged into a nightmarish inferno of war and death.

Cast
 Joe Manganiello as Lieutenant Sean Macklin
 Mr. Kennedy as Master chief petty officer Carter Holter 
 Channon Roe as Chief Petty Officer Kevin Derricks
 Yancey Arias as Alvaro Cardona
 Chris J. Johnson as Petty Officer 3rd Class Steve Gaines
 Antony Matos as Petty Officer 2nd Class Greg Armstrong
 Jennice Fuentes as Nicole Jenkins
 Keith David as Commander Scott Boytano
 Steven Bauer as General Manuel Valez
 Tim Matheson as Carl Dobb
 Luzangeli Justiniano as Maria Cardona
 Anibal O. Lleras as Carlos Rivera
 Rey Hernandez as Ramirez

Production
The film takes place in Colombia, but was shot in Puerto Rico.

Release
The film was released on January 6, 2009.

As with all WWE films, Behind Enemy Lines: Colombia was constantly advertised on WWE programming, shortly before, and after its release. Kennedy also frequently made brief appearances to promote the film.

Sequel
Behind Enemy Lines: Colombia was followed by another direct-to-video sequel, SEAL Team 8: Behind Enemy Lines, starring Tom Sizemore.

See also
 List of films featuring the United States Navy SEALs

References

External links 
 
 
 
 
 

Behind Enemy Lines (film series)
2009 direct-to-video films
2009 films
American direct-to-video films
American action war films
2000s English-language films
20th Century Fox direct-to-video films
Direct-to-video sequel films
2000s action war films
Films about United States Navy SEALs
Films scored by Joseph Conlan
Films set in Colombia
War adventure films
WWE Studios films
Films shot in Puerto Rico
Films directed by Tim Matheson
2000s American films